Aloysius James "Mike" Handiboe (July 21, 1887 – January 31, 1953) nicknamed "Coalyard Mike", was a Major League Baseball outfielder. In 5 career games, he had 1 hit in 15 at-bats, with 2 walks. He batted and threw left-handed.

Handiboe was born in Washington, D.C. and died in Savannah, Georgia.

External links

1887 births
1953 deaths
New York Highlanders players
Major League Baseball outfielders
Baseball players from Washington, D.C.
Minor league baseball managers
Goldsboro Giants players
Savannah Indians players
Savannah Colts players
Albany Babies players
Hopewell Powder Puffs players
Petersburg Goobers players